The 2016–17 Togolese Championnat National season was the top level of football competition in Togo after being cancelled in 2015. It began on 11 September 2016 and concluded on 28 May 2017.

Standings
  1.AS Togo-Port (Lomé)                   26  14  6  6  39-17  48  Champions
  2.AC Sèmassi de Sokodé                  26  12 10  4  29-19  46
  3.Maranatha FC de Fiokpo (Womé)         26  11  7  8  25-30  40
  4.US Koroki de Tchamba                  26  10  9  7  22-21  39
  5.Dynamic Togolais FC (Lomé)            26   9 10  7  27-22  37
  6.Unisport de Sokodé                    26  10  7  9  25-23  37
  7.Foadan FC de Dapaong                  26   9  9  8  24-20  36
  8.AS OTR (Lomé)                         26   9  9  8  24-21  36
  9.ASKO de Kara                          26   9  8  9  28-29  35
 10. Gbikinti de Bassar                    26   7 13  6  31-21  34
 ----------------------------------------------------------------
 11. Gomido FC de Kpalimé                  26   8 10  8  25-17  34  Relegated
 12.OC Agaza de Lomé                      26   9  6 11  23-30  33  Relegated
 13.Anges FC de Notsè                     26   9  4 13  23-35  31  Relegated
 14.Kotoko de Laviè                       26   0  4 22   8-48   4  Relegated

References

Football leagues in Togo
Championnat National
Championnat National
Togo